Crimhthann mac Reachtghal (died 757) was Abbot of Clonfert, Ireland.

He is very uncertainly associated with Crimthann the Warlike, who defeated the Delbhna Nuadat at the battle of Bealach Cro in 756, during the reign of King Aedh Ailghin of Uí Maine, died 767.

References

 Annals of Ulster at CELT: Corpus of Electronic Texts at University College Cork
 Annals of Tigernach at CELT: Corpus of Electronic Texts at University College Cork
Revised edition of McCarthy's synchronisms at Trinity College Dublin.
 Byrne, Francis John (2001), Irish Kings and High-Kings, Dublin: Four Courts Press, 
 Lysaght, Eamonn (1978), The Surnames of Ireland. , pp. 233–34.

People from County Galway
8th-century Irish abbots
757 deaths
Year of birth unknown